Maisy Hiu Ching Ma (born November 18, 1999) is a Hong Kong figure skater. She has competed in the free skate at three ISU Championships.

Career
Ma's family moved to Beijing with her family when she was three years old.  Her nursery school was next to an ice rink.  She was entranced by the skaters and started skating herself for fun.

Ma began skating in 2005. As a child, she was taught by Haijun Gao.

2013–14 season
Ma began appearing on the junior international level in the 2013–14 season. After placing fifth at the Asian Trophy, she debuted on the ISU Junior Grand Prix (JGP) series, placing 6th in Gdańsk, Poland, in September 2013. She appeared at the 2014 World Junior Figure Skating Championships in Sofia, Bulgaria, but did not advance to the free skate. She trained under Tammy Gambill in Riverside, California until the end of the season.

2014–15 season
In the 2014–15 season, Ma was coached by Rafael Arutyunyan and Nadia Kanaeva in California. She appeared at the 2014 World Junior Figure Skating Championships in Tallinn, Estonia, but did not advance to the freeskate.

2015–16 season
In the 2015–16 season, Ma joined Christine Krall and Damon Allen in Colorado Springs, Colorado. Making her senior international debut, she finished 11th at the U.S. International Classic, a Challenger Series (CS) event in September 2015. In January 2016, she won the senior silver medal at the Reykjavík International Games. In February, she competed at her first senior ISU Championship at 2016 Four Continents in Taipei, Taiwan. At the 2016 World Junior Championships in Debrecen, Hungary, she qualified for the final segment by placing 11th in the short and went on to finish 15th overall.

2016–17 season and after
At the beginning of the 2017–18 season, Ma planned to participate in the Asian Figure Skating Trophy, but had to withdraw due to a recurring ankle injury.

Programs

Competitive highlights
CS: Challenger Series; JGP: Junior Grand Prix

References

External links
 

1999 births
Hong Kong female single skaters
Figure skaters at the 2017 Asian Winter Games
Asian Games competitors for Hong Kong
Living people